"Ladies" is a song by American rapper Sarai for her debut album, The Original (2003). It peaked at number 1 on the US Billboard Bubbling Under Hot 100, 19 on the US Billboard Mainstream Top 40 and 28 on the US Billboard Rhythmic Top 40 chart.

Music video
The music video for "Ladies" was filmed by director Karim Karmi and produced by Melissa Larsen.

Track listing
CD single (2003)
"Ladies" (Radio Edit) – 3:22
"Ladies" (Album Version) – 3:22
"Ladies" (Instrumental) – 3:22
"Ladies" (Acappella) – 3:22
"Ladies" (Call Out Hook) – 0:15

Charts

References 

2003 songs
Epic Records singles
2003 debut singles
East Coast hip hop songs
American hip hop songs